The second Celebrity series of Ex on the Beach will begin airing on 15 February 2022. It is the twelfth series of the show overall. The series was confirmed in September 2021 when it was announced that filming had begun and would feature another full cast of celebrities rather than civilians. This series was filmed in Gran Canaria.

Cast
The list of celebrity cast members was released on 25 January 2022. They include five men; RuPaul's Drag Race UK queen A'Whora, The Only Way Is Essex cast member James "Lockie" Lock, star of Too Hot To Handle Kori Sampson, Love Island UK islander Mike Boateng, and Geordie Shores Nathan Henry, as well as four women; stars of Love Island UK Kaz Crossley and Megan Barton-Hanson, Married at First Sight Australia cast member KC Osborne, and Paradise hotel Norway islander Sofie Karlstad.Bold' indicates original cast member; all other cast were brought into the series as an ex.

Duration of cast

Table Key
 Key:  = "Cast member" is featured in this episode
 Key:  = "Cast member" arrives on the beach
 Key:  = "Cast member" has an ex arrive on the beach
 Key:  = "Cast member" has two exes arrive on the beach
 Key:  = "Cast member" arrives on the beach and has an ex arrive during the same episode
 Key:  = "Cast member" leaves the beach
 Key:  = "Cast member" has an ex arrive on the beach and leaves during the same episode
 Key:  = "Cast member" arrives on the beach and leaves during the same episode
 Key:  = "Cast member" features in this episode as a guest
 Key:  = "Cast member" does not feature in this episode

Episodes

Ratings

References

External links
 

2022 British television seasons
11